Press Information Department or PID, is a government body responsible for disseminating government information to the media and a media regulatory organization. It is located in Dhaka, Bangladesh. It is under the Ministry of Information.

History
In August 2014, the Press Information Department ordered the press to not use the term indigenous when referring to tribal communities in Bangladesh. In February 2017 Begum Kamrun Nahar became the Principal Information Officer of the Press Information Department. She was the first female head of the Press Information Department.

The Press Information Department ordered cable operators from providing foreign channels that air commercials of local companies on 3 January 2017. On 9 November 2017 the government of Bangladesh announced that all news websites would have to register with Press Information Department. The Editor's Council asked the government to exempt online newspapers from registration. Government officials hold press conferences in the Press Information Department Conference Hall.

References

Government departments of Bangladesh
1972 establishments in Bangladesh
Mass media in Bangladesh
Organisations based in Dhaka
Ministry of Information and Broadcasting (Bangladesh)